Schempp-Hirth TG-15 is a designation used by the United States military.  It has two variants:

 TG-15A: high performance two seat glider, Schempp-Hirth Duo Discus
 TG-15B: Standard Class glider, the Schempp-Hirth Discus-2

1990s German sailplanes